Sisara (also Romanized as Sīsarā) is a village in Kelarabad Rural District, Kelarabad District, Abbasabad County, Mazandaran Province, Iran. At the 2006 census, its population was 778, in 222 families.

References 

Populated places in Abbasabad County